Kukkonen is a Finnish surname. Notable people with the surname include:

Annika Kukkonen (born 1990), Finnish women's footballer
Antti Kukkonen (1889–1978), Finnish Lutheran pastor and politician
Lasse Kukkonen (born 1981), Finnish ice hockey player
Mikko Kukkonen (born 1988), Finnish ice hockey player
Sinikka Kukkonen (1947–2016), Finnish orienteer
Sirpa Kukkonen (born 1958), Finnish orienteer

Finnish-language surnames